8Z or 8-Z may refer to:

8Z, IATA code for Venezuelan airline LASER Airlines 
8Z, IATA code for Wizz Air Bulgaria
8Z, former IATA code for Albatros Airlines
South African Class 8Z 2-8-0 locomotive
Typ 8Z, internal designation for Audi A2
R4D-8Z, a model of  Douglas C-47 Skytrain

See also
Z8 (disambiguation)